Pau Brasil is a 2009 Brazilian drama film, the first feature film by director Fernando Belens, an experienced short filmmaker, with about 20 short films made since the 70s.

The film was screened at various film festivals, including the Mostra do Filme Livre, Mostra Internacional de São Paulo, the Panorama Internacional Coisa de Cinema and the Los Angeles Brazilian Film Festival. Although it was completed in 2009, Pau Brasil only managed to reach the Brazilian commercial circuit in April 2014.

Cast
Bertrand Duarte as Nives
Osvaldo Mil as Joaquim
Fernanda Paquelet as Juraci
Arany Santana as Leandra

References

External links 
 

Brazilian drama films
2009 drama films
2009 films
2000s Portuguese-language films